Maubeuge (historical  or) is a commune in the Nord department in northern France.

History
Maubeuge (ancient Malbodium, from Latin, derived from the Old Frankish name Malboden, meaning "assizes of Boden") owes its origin to Maubeuge Abbey, a double monastery, for men and women, founded in the 7th century by Saint Aldego, the relics of whom are preserved in the church. It subsequently belonged to the territory of Hainaut.

The town was part of the Spanish Netherlands and changed hands a number of times before it was finally ceded to France in the 1678 Treaty of Nijmegen. As part of Vauban's pré carré plan that protected France's northern borders with a double line of fortresses, it was extensively fortified as directed by Louis XIV of France.

Besieged in 1793 by Prince Josias of Saxe-Coburg-Saalfeld, it was relieved by the victory of Wattignies, which is commemorated by a monument in the town. It was unsuccessfully besieged in 1814, but was compelled to capitulate, after a vigorous resistance, in the Hundred Days.

As a fortress, Maubeuge has an old enceinte of bastion trace which serves as the center of an important entrenched camp of 18 miles perimeter. The fortress was constructed after the War of 1870 but has since been modernized and augmented.

The forts were besieged in World War I by the German Empire. Maubeuge suffered heavily in World War II: 90% of the town centre was destroyed by bombardments in May 1940. Fighting again occurred in early September 1944, in and around the outskirts of Maubeuge, involving units of the U.S. 1st Infantry Division during the American push toward Belgium.

Heraldry

Geography

Climate

Maubeuge has a oceanic climate (Köppen climate classification Cfb).

Population

Economy
There are important foundries, forges and blast furnaces, together with manufactures of machine tools and porcelain.

The town has a board of trade arbitration, a communal college, a commercial and industrial school.

Transport
Being close to the Belgian border, Maubeuge station has two lines to Belgium: one leading North towards Mons, the other Eastbound to Charleroi. Neither have seen passenger service for several years; however, from December 2018 a limited service to Namur via Charleroi was announced. Trains to the South-West are frequent.

There is an aerodrome in nearby Elesmes but it is purely recreational, with no facilities for commercial air transport of either passengers or cargo.

Tour de France
Maurice Garin, the winner of the inaugural 1903 Tour de France, began his cycling career in 1892 with the local Maubeuge cycling club, when he finished fifth in the  Maubeuge-Hirson-Maubeuge race. In 2003, on the 100th anniversary of his win, he was commemorated with a street named after him.

Personalities
Leandre Griffit, footballer
Jan Gossaert, painter
Benjamin Pavard, footballer
Benjamin Saint-Huile, politician

See also
Siege of Maubeuge (24 August - 7 September 1914)
Fortified Sector of Maubeuge
Communes of the Nord department
Un clair de lune à Maubeuge

Sources
http://www.lonesentry.com/gi_stories_booklets/1stinfantry/

Footnotes

External links

 Official website (in French)
 Webpage about the fortifications

Communes of Nord (French department)
Vauban fortifications in France